The A Tri-Rivers District is a high school conference in the state of Virginia that comprises high schools in Southeastern Virginia west of the Hampton Roads metropolitan area.  The Tri-Rivers District schools compete in A Region A with the schools from the A/AA Eastern Shore District, the A Northern Neck District, and the A Tidewater District of the Virginia High School League.

Member schools
 Appomattox Regional Governor's School of Petersburg, Virginia
 Franklin High School of Franklin, Virginia
 Surry County High School of Dendron, Virginia
 Sussex Central High School of Sussex, Virginia
 Brunswick High School of Lawrenceville, Virginia
 Windsor High School of Windsor, Virginia
 Greensville County High School of Emporia, Virginia
 Park View High School (South Hill, Virginia)
 Southampton High School of Courtland, Virginia
Virginia High School League